A borehole is a narrow shaft bored in the ground, either vertically or horizontally. A borehole may be constructed for many different purposes, including the extraction of water (drilled water well and tube well), other liquids (such as petroleum), or gases (such as natural gas). It may also be part of a geotechnical investigation, environmental site assessment, mineral exploration, temperature measurement, as a pilot hole for installing piers or underground utilities, for geothermal installations, or for underground storage of unwanted substances, e.g. in carbon capture and storage.

Importance 
Engineers and environmental consultants use the term borehole to collectively describe all of the various types of holes drilled as part of a geotechnical investigation or environmental site assessment (a so-called Phase II ESA). This includes holes advanced to collect soil samples, water samples or rock cores, to advance in situ sampling equipment, or to install monitoring wells or piezometers.  Samples collected from boreholes are often tested in a laboratory to determine their physical properties, or to assess levels of various chemical constituents or contaminants.

Typically, a borehole used as a water well is completed by installing a vertical pipe (casing) and well screen to keep the borehole from caving. This also helps prevent surface contaminants from entering the borehole and protects any installed pump from drawing in sand and sediment. Oil and natural gas wells are completed in a similar, albeit usually more complex, manner.

As detailed in proxy (climate), borehole temperature measurements at a series of different depths can be effectively "inverted" (a mathematical formula to solve a matrix equation) to help estimate historic surface temperatures.

Clusters of small-diameter boreholes equipped with heat exchangers made of plastic PEX pipe can be used to store heat or cold between opposing seasons in a mass of native rock. The technique is called seasonal thermal energy storage. Media that can be used for this technique ranges from gravel to bedrock. There can be a few to several hundred boreholes, and in practice, depths have ranged from 150 to 1000 feet.

History
Borehole drilling has a long history. By at least the Han Dynasty (202 BC – 220 AD), the Chinese used deep borehole drilling for mining and other projects. The British sinologist and historian Michael Loewe states that borehole sites could reach as deep as 600 m (2000 ft). K.S. Tom describes the drilling process: "The Chinese method of deep drilling was accomplished by a team of men jumping on and off a beam to impact the drilling bit while the boring tool was rotated by buffalo and oxen." This was the same method used for extracting petroleum in California during the 1860s (i.e. "Kicking Her Down"). A Western Han Dynasty bronze foundry discovered in Xinglong, Hebei had nearby mining shafts which reached depths of 100 m (328 ft) with spacious mining areas; the shafts and rooms were complete with a timber frame, ladders and iron tools. By the first century BC, Chinese craftsmen cast iron drill bits and drillers were able to drill boreholes up to 4800 feet (1500 m) deep. By the eleventh century AD, the Chinese were able to drill boreholes up to 3000 feet in depth. Drilling for boreholes was time-consuming and long. As the depth of the holes varied, the drilling of a single well could last nearly one full decade. It wasn't up until the 19th century that Europe and the West would catch up and rival ancient Chinese borehole drilling technology.

For many years, the world's longest borehole was the Kola Superdeep Borehole in Russia. The Chayvo Z-44 extended-reach well took the title of the world's longest borehole on 27 August 2012. Z-44's total measured depth is 12,376 m (40,604 ft). However, ERD wells are more shallow than the Kola Borehole, owing to a large horizontal displacement.

Methodology 

Drillers may sink a borehole using a drilling rig or a hand-operated rig. The machinery and techniques to advance a borehole vary considerably according to manufacturer, geological conditions, and the intended purpose. For offshore drilling floating units or platforms supported by the seafloor are used for the drilling rig.

See also
 Askam Borehole in Pennsylvania
 Casing cutter
 Deep borehole disposal
 Hole opener
 Horizontal drillhole disposal
 Kola Superdeep Borehole
 Vertical seismic profile

References

External links
 Boreholes: Swiss Geological Survey

Chinese inventions
Drilling technology
Hole making